Makara is a surname that occurs in several cultures and languages. It is a Slavic surname, which is a variant of Makar, derived from the given names Makary or Makar, which are forms of the Greek name Makarios, meaning blessed. 

Makara is also a Japanese family name. The name may refer to:

Robert Makara (born 1948), Ukrainian skier
Makara Naotaka (1536–1570), Japanese samurai 
Oleg Makara (born 1954), Slovak film director
Gamzee Makara and Kurloz Makara, fictional characters from the webcomic Homestuck

References

Polish-language surnames
Ukrainian-language surnames
Japanese-language surnames